Sathyam Shivam Sundaram is a 1987 Indian Kannada-language film directed by K. S. R. Das and produced by G. R. K. Raju. The film stars Vishnuvardhan, Raadhika, Sumithra and Vajramuni. The film has musical score by K. Chakravarthy. The movie is a remake of 1985 Telugu movie Jwala. However, while the hero played dual role in the original, Vishnuvardhan played a triple role including the father's role.

Cast

Vishnuvardhan as Sathyaraj, Shivaraj and Sundaraj
Raadhika as Geetha
Sumithra
Keerthi
Vajramuni
Sudheer
N. S. Rao
Ravikiran
K. S. Ashwath in Guest Appearance
Lokanath in Guest Appearance
 Master Manjunath in Guest Appearance

Soundtrack
The music was composed by K. Chakravarthy.

References

External links
 

1987 films
1980s Kannada-language films
Films directed by K. S. R. Das
Films scored by K. Chakravarthy
Kannada remakes of Telugu films